The women's 10,000 metres event at the 2011 Summer Universiade was held on 16 August.

Results

References
Results

10000
2011 in women's athletics
2011